The Uchusuma River  originates from the Peruvian Altiplano, crosses the northern tip of Chile and reaches Bolivia where empties into Mauri River.

See also
List of rivers of Bolivia
List of rivers of Chile
List of rivers of Peru

References
 Hidrografía Regional del Altiplano de Chile, retrieved on 15 June 2012 in Spanish Language

Rivers of La Paz Department (Bolivia)
Rivers of Chile
Rivers of Peru
Rivers of Arica y Parinacota Region
International rivers of South America